Kostadin Petrov (born 30 March 1992) is a Macedonian handball player who plays for RK Alkaloid and the North Macedonia national team.

References
 http://www.eurohandball.com/ec/cl/men/2015-16/player/549872/KostadinPetrov

1992 births
Living people
Macedonian male handball players
Sportspeople from Veles, North Macedonia
Mediterranean Games competitors for North Macedonia
Competitors at the 2022 Mediterranean Games